USS McCandless (FF-1084) was a  of the US Navy. Commissioned in 1972, she served for 22 years before being decommissioned as a training frigate, and sold to the Turkish Navy as TCG Trakya (F-254). She also participated in Operation Desert Storm in 1991.

Design and description
The Knox class design was derived from the  modified to extend range and without a long-range missile system. They displaced  at full load. Their crew consisted of 13 officers and 211 enlisted men.

The ships were equipped with one Westinghouse geared steam turbine that drove the single propeller shaft.

The Knox-class ships were armed with a 5"/54 caliber Mark 42 gun forward and a single 3-inch/50-caliber gun aft. They mounted an eight-round RUR-5 ASROC launcher between the 5-inch (127 mm) gun and the bridge. Close-range anti-submarine defense was provided by two twin  Mk 32 torpedo tubes. The ships were equipped with a torpedo-carrying DASH drone helicopter; its telescoping hangar and landing pad were positioned amidships aft of the mack. Beginning in the 1970s, the DASH was replaced by a SH-2 Seasprite LAMPS I helicopter and the hangar and landing deck were accordingly enlarged. Most ships also had the 3-inch (76 mm) gun replaced by an eight-cell BPDMS missile launcher in the early 1970s.

Service history 
McCandlesss first deployment was a cruise to the Middle East that began in August 1973, and lasted through January of the following year. Subsequent to this initial voyage overseas, McCandless adopted a regular schedule of deployments which took her to the waters of the North Atlantic, Mediterranean, Caribbean, and Persian Gulf. McCandlesss last tactical missions were in support of Operation Desert Storm—a US-led coalition force of 34 nations against Iraq in response to Iraq's invasion of Kuwait— from January through May 1990, and June through December 1991. McCandless was awarded the Kuwait Liberation Medal by Kuwait for her efforts during these deployments.

31 December 1991 marked McCandlesss assignment to the Naval Reserve Force, Atlantic (Norfolk, Virginia) where she was reclassified as a training frigate (FFT-1084). McCandless was one of only eight ships of her class subject to this redesignation. Simultaneously decommissioned and leased to Turkey under the new name of TCG Trakya (F-254) on 6 May 1994, McCandless was struck from the Naval Vessel Register on 11 January. Turkey purchased the vessel in February 2002. She was decommissioned in 2003 and scrapped.

Ship Awards
Sea Service Deployment Ribbon 
Humanitarian Service Ribbon
CG Meritorious Unit Commendation
National Defense Service Medal w/1 star
Southwest Asia Service Medal w/ 1 star
Kuwait Liberation Medal (Kuwait)

Notes

References

External links
 
 USS McCandless Unofficial Home Page
 

 

Ships built in Bridge City, Louisiana
Knox-class frigates
1971 ships
Ships transferred from the United States Navy to the Turkish Navy
Cold War frigates and destroyer escorts of the United States